Aurelius Township is a civil township of Ingham County in the U.S. state of Michigan.  As of the 2010 census, the township population was 3,525, an increase from 3,318 at the 2000 census.

Communities

Geography

Demographics
As of the census of 2000, there were 3,318 people, 1,130 households, and 939 families residing in the township. The racial makeup of the township was 96.50% White, 0.63% African American, 0.39% Native American, 0.27% Asian, 0.81% from other races, and 1.39% from two or more races. Hispanic or Latino of any race were 3.62% of the population.

There were 1,130 households, out of which 40.2% had children under the age of 18 living with them, 74.4% were married couples living together, 5.3% had a female householder with no husband present, and 16.9% were non-families. 13.7% of all households were made up of individuals, and 4.4% had someone living alone who was 65 years of age or older.  The average household size was 2.93 and the average family size was 3.24.

In the township the population was spread out, with 29.0% under the age of 18, 6.8% from 18 to 24, 28.8% from 25 to 44, 27.3% from 45 to 64, and 8.0% who were 65 years of age or older.  The median age was 38 years. For every 100 females, there were 101.3 males.  For every 100 females age 18 and over, there were 100.1 males.

The median income for a household in the township was $62,750, and the median income for a family was $69,712. Males had a median income of $45,341 versus $30,959 for females. The per capita income for the township was $22,983.  About 1.9% of families and 3.9% of the population were below the poverty line, including 3.1% of those under age 18 and 1.3% of those age 65 or over.

Notable residents
Henry L. Haskell, inventor and entrepreneur, was born there.

References

External links
Official website

Townships in Michigan
Townships in Ingham County, Michigan
Lansing–East Lansing metropolitan area
Populated places established in 1837
1837 establishments in Michigan